East Hampshire District Council in Hampshire England is elected every four years. Since the last boundary changes in 2003, 44 councillors have been elected from 38 wards.

Political control
Since the first election to the council in 1973 political control of the council has been held by the following parties:

Leadership
The leaders of the council since 1999 have been:

Council elections
1973 Petersfield District Council election
1976 East Hampshire District Council election
1979 East Hampshire District Council election (New ward boundaries)
1983 East Hampshire District Council election
1987 East Hampshire District Council election (District boundary changes took place but the number of seats remained the same)
1991 East Hampshire District Council election
1995 East Hampshire District Council election (District boundary changes took place but the number of seats remained the same)
1999 East Hampshire District Council election
2003 East Hampshire District Council election (New ward boundaries increased the number of seats by 2)
2007 East Hampshire District Council election
2011 East Hampshire District Council election
2015 East Hampshire District Council election
2019 East Hampshire District Council election

District result maps

By-election results

1995-1999

1999-2003

2003-2007

2007-2011

2011-2015

References

 By-election results

External links
 East Hampshire District Council

 
East Hampshire District
Council elections in Hampshire
District council elections in England